Lynn B. Herman (born October 30, 1956) is a former Republican member of the Pennsylvania House of Representatives.

He is a 1974 graduate of Philipsburg-Osceola Area High School. He earned a B.A. in 1978 and an M.P.A. in 1980 from the University of Pittsburgh.

He was first elected to represent the 77th legislative district in the Pennsylvania House of Representatives in 1982. He retired prior to the 2006 elections.

References

External links
 official PA House profile

Living people
Republican Party members of the Pennsylvania House of Representatives
University of Pittsburgh alumni
1956 births
People from Philipsburg, Centre County, Pennsylvania